Akhtaruzzaman Chowdhury Babu (1 May 1945 – 4 November 2012) was a Bangladesh Awami League politician and a former Jatiya Sangsad member representing the Chittagong-12 constituency. He was awarded Independence Award in 2021 posthumously. He was also the principal accused of the murder of businessman Humayun Zahir and was infamous for his role in capturing United Commercial Bank Ltd putting the board members at gunpoint.

Early life
Babu was born on 1 May 1945. He was elected to East Pakistan provincial assembly from Anwara-West Patia in 1970. He was involved with Bangladesh Chhatra League as a student. During Bangladesh Liberation war, he organized Swadhin Bangla Betar Kendra in Chittagong.

Career
Babu was elected to Parliament on in 1986, 1991, and 2008 from Chittagong-12 as a Bangladesh Awami League candidate. He was made the president of the South Chittagong District unit of the Awami League in 1977, a position held till his death. He was the founder and chairman of United Commercial Bank Ltd and Aramit Group. He served as the president of Federation of Bangladesh Chambers of Commerce and Industry. He was the chair of the Parliamentary Standing Committee on the Ministry of Textiles and Jute.

Criminal charges
Akhtaruzzaman was the principal accused in the murder case of businessman Humayun Zahir who was killed after a feud over the control of United Commercial Bank Limited board arose on 8 April 1993. He was ousted from the board on charges of defalcation and irregularities. He was later arrested but after being released on bail, he left the country. He returned to the country in 1996 after Awami League formed the government and Sheikh Hasina became Prime Minister. He was a close confidante of Sheikh Hasina and was serving as the industry and commerce secretary of the Awami League then.

On 26 August 1999 he stormed the bank with around 40 armed cadres led by his son Saifuzzaman Chowdhury when a board meeting was underway. They forced the chairman Zafar Ahmed Chowdhury and the other board members of the bank to submit their resignation from the board at gunpoint and declared himself the chairman of the bank's board. It is alleged that his hired thugs assaulted the board members and stripped the chairman of the bank naked.

Achievement
Akhtaruzzaman Chowdhury Babu organized the Swadhin Bangla Betar Kendra in Chittagong. He also founded United Commercial Bank Limited and made it one of Bangladesh's most successful banks. Late Akhtaruzzaman Chowdhury Babu was awarded the "Independence Award 2021" for his tremendous contribution in the war 1971, the highest civilian award given by the government of Bangladesh.

Death
Babu died on 4 November 2012 from kidney complications at Mount Elizabeth Hospital in Singapore. The Muradpur-Lalkhan Bazar flyover has been named Akhtaruzzaman Chowdhury flyover in his memory. His daughter, Roxana Zaman, is a director of United Commercial Bank.

References

1945 births
2012 deaths
Awami League politicians
4th Jatiya Sangsad members
5th Jatiya Sangsad members
9th Jatiya Sangsad members
Bangladeshi bankers
People from Anwara Upazila
Notre Dame College, Dhaka alumni
Recipients of the Independence Day Award